Suzanne Braun Levine is an American author and editor.

Career 
From 1972 until 1988 she was the first editor of Ms., and she was later the first female editor of the Columbia Journalism Review. While at Ms. she developed and produced the documentary She's Nobody's Baby: American Women in the 20th Century, which aired as an HBO special and won a Peabody award. She later edited the book based on the show. She was the guest Editor-in-Chief of the 30th Anniversary issue of Ms. magazine in 2002. She was named a Ms. Magazine "Woman of the Year" in 2004. She joined the Board of Civic Ventures (now Encore.org) in 2009, and is also on the Board of the Ms. Foundation for Education and Communication, and on the Advisory Board for the Women’s Media Center and The Transition Network. She gave a talk at TEDxWomen in 2011.

Levine wrote for many websites including: Feisty Side of Fifty, The Transition Network, The Third Age, Vibrant Nation, AARP, Huff/Post50, Next/Avenue, SheWrites, and Feminist.com. She contributed the piece "Parenting: A New Social Contract" to the 2003 anthology Sisterhood Is Forever: The Women's Anthology for a New Millennium, edited by Robin Morgan.

She also appeared on TV and radio shows including: Oprah, Charlie Rose, Today, and NPR.

The papers from her time at Ms. magazine are now in the Sophia Smith Collection of Women’s Archives at Smith College.

Personal life 
She is married to the attorney Robert F. Levine, and has two children.

Books
 Levine, Suzanne Braun; Lyons, Harriet (1980). A Decade of Women: A Ms. History of the Seventies in Words and Pictures
 Levine, Suzanne Braun (editor); Dworkin, Andrea (author) (1983). She's Nobody's Baby; A History of American Women in the 20th Century
 Levine, Suzanne Braun (Apr 17, 2000). Father Courage: What Happens When Men Put Family First
 Levine, Suzanne Braun Parenting: a new social contract in Morgan, Robin (2003). Sisterhood is Forever
 Levine, Suzanne Braun (Feb 7, 2005). Woman's Guide to Second Adulthood
 Levine, Suzanne Braun (Dec 27, 2005). Inventing the Rest of Our Lives: Women in Second Adulthood
 
 Levine, Suzanne Braun (Mar 30, 2010). Fifty Is the New Fifty: Ten Life Lessons for Women in Second Adulthood
 Levine, Suzanne Braun (Dec 29, 2011). How We Love Now: Sex and the New Intimacy in Second Adulthood
 Levine, Suzanne Braun (Apr 16, 2013). You Gotta Have Girlfriends: A Post-Fifty Posse Is Good for Your Health

References

External links

 Suzanne Braun Levine's website
 Suzanne Braun Levine papers at the Sophia Smith (Smith College) Collection, Smith College Special Collections

American women writers
American feminist writers
American women's rights activists
Living people
Year of birth missing (living people)
21st-century American women